2013 Indonesian Premier Division was the second and the final edition of Indonesian Premier Division organized by LPIS before reverted to be organized by PT.LI.
PSS Sleman was the champions but not awarded promotion to 2014 Indonesian Super League.

Group stage

Group 1

Group 2

Knockout stage

Semi-final
PSS Sleman became the host for Semi-final, Third place play-off and Final

Third place play-off

Final

Champion

References

Indonesian Premier Division seasons
Football in Indonesia